Leon Russell (born Claude Russell Bridges; April 2, 1942 – November 13, 2016) was an American musician and songwriter who was involved with numerous bestselling records during his 60-year career that spanned multiple genres, including rock and roll, country, gospel, bluegrass, rhythm and blues, southern rock, blues rock, folk, surf and the Tulsa Sound.

He collaborated with many notable artists and recorded at least 31 albums and 430 songs. He wrote "Delta Lady", recorded by Joe Cocker, and organized and performed with Cocker's Mad Dogs & Englishmen tour in 1970. His "A Song for You", which was named to the Grammy Hall of Fame in 2018, has been recorded by more than 200 artists, and his song "This Masquerade" by more than 75.

As a pianist, he played in his early years on albums by the Beach Boys, Dick Dale, and Jan and Dean. On his first album, Leon Russell, in 1970, the musicians included Eric Clapton, Ringo Starr, and George Harrison. One of his early fans, Elton John, said that Russell was a "mentor" and an "inspiration". They recorded their album The Union in 2010, earning them a Grammy nomination.

Russell produced and played in recording sessions for Bob Dylan, Frank Sinatra, Ike & Tina Turner, the Rolling Stones, and many other artists. He wrote and recorded the hits "Tight Rope" and "Lady Blue". He performed at The Concert for Bangladesh in 1971, along with Harrison, Dylan, and Clapton; he earned a Grammy Award for this.

His recordings earned six gold records. He received two Grammy Awards from seven nominations. In 2011, he was inducted into both the Rock and Roll Hall of Fame and the Songwriters Hall of Fame.

Early life
Russell was born in Lawton, Oklahoma, on April 2, 1942. He began playing the piano at the age of four.

Russell attended Will Rogers High School in Tulsa, Oklahoma, as did David Gates, with whom he had an early collaboration as The Fencemen.

Career

1950s/1960s
Russell began his musical career at the age of 14, in 1956, in the nightclubs of Tulsa. In high school, he played piano in a band, the Accents, with David Gates, who would later achieve fame in the band Bread. Leon with the Starlighters, which included J. J. Cale, Leo Feathers, Chuck Blackwell, and Johnny Williams, were instrumental in creating the style of music known as the Tulsa Sound. After settling in Los Angeles in 1958, he studied guitar with James Burton. He was known mostly as a session musician early in his career. As Russell developed his solo artist career he crossed genres to include rock and roll, blues, bluegrass and gospel music. As a session musician he has played for and with artists as varied as Jan and Dean, Gary Lewis & the Playboys, George Harrison, Delaney Bramlett, Freddy Cannon, Ringo Starr, Doris Day, Elton John, Ray Charles, Eric Clapton, the Byrds, Barbra Streisand, the Beach Boys, the Ventures, Willie Nelson, Badfinger, the Tijuana Brass, Frank Sinatra, the Band, Bob Dylan, J. J. Cale, B.B. King, Dave Mason, Glen Campbell, Joe Cocker, the Rolling Stones, and the Flying Burrito Brothers.

In Los Angeles, Russell played as a first-call studio musician on many of the popular songs of the 1960s, including some by the Byrds, Gary Lewis & the Playboys, Bobby Pickett, and Herb Alpert. He also played piano on many Phil Spector productions, including recordings by the Ronettes, the Crystals, and Darlene Love and in the 1963 A Christmas Gift for You from Phil Spector album. He can be seen in the 1964 concert film T.A.M.I. Show playing piano with the Wrecking Crew (an informal name for the top Los Angeles session musicians of the 1960s), sporting short, dark, slicked-back hair, in contrast to his later look. Soon after, he was hired as Snuff Garrett's assistant and creative developer, playing on numerous number-one singles, including "This Diamond Ring" by Gary Lewis & the Playboys.

In the mid-1960s, he wrote or co-wrote songs, including two hits for Gary Lewis and the Playboys: "Everybody Loves a Clown" (which reached the Billboard Top 40 on October 9, 1965, remaining on the chart for eight weeks and reaching number 4) and "She's Just My Style" (which entered the Billboard Top 40 on December 18, 1965, and rose to number 3). In 1964, he appeared on various TV shows, performing songs by Chuck Berry and others.

He played xylophone and bells on the 1966 single "The Joker Went Wild", sung by Brian Hyland and written by Bobby Russell (no relation to Leon). He also contributed to recording sessions with Dorsey Burnette and with Glen Campbell, whose 1967 album Gentle on My Mind credited him as "Russell Bridges" on piano, and arranged and conducted the 1966 easy listening album Rhapsodies for Young Lovers by the Midnight String Quartet. He co-produced and arranged hits by Tom Northcott, including "Sunny Goodge Street" in 1967, written by Donovan.

Russell released his first solo single, "Everybody's Talking 'Bout the Young", for Dot Records in 1965.

The 1968 release of Look Inside the Asylum Choir by Smash Records was a recording of a studio group consisting of Russell and Marc Benno ("The Asylum Choir").

Russell and Denny Cordell established Shelter Records in 1969. The company operated from 1969 to 1981, with offices in Los Angeles and Tulsa.

Russell performed as a member of Delaney & Bonnie and Friends in 1969 and 1970, playing guitar and keyboards on their albums and as part of the touring band. Through this group, he met George Harrison and others with whom he would work over the next couple of years.

Russell's first commercial success as a songwriter came when Joe Cocker recorded the song "Delta Lady" for his 1969 album, Joe Cocker! The album, co-produced and arranged by Russell, reached number 11 on the Billboard 200. Russell went on to organize and perform in (playing either piano or lead guitar) the 1970 Mad Dogs & Englishmen tour, using many of the musicians from Delaney and Bonnie's band. "Superstar", co-written by Russell, was sung by The Carpenters and other performers.

1970s
During the Mad Dogs & Englishmen tour, Shelter Records released his 1970 solo album, Leon Russell, which included the first recording of "A Song for You". This has become one of his best-known songs, with versions released by more than 40 different artists, including the Carpenters, Ray Charles, Billy Eckstine, Peggy Lee, Willie Nelson, Helen Reddy, Carmen McRae, Elkie Brooks, Freda Payne, and Donny Hathaway. Both the Carpenters and the Temptations named an album after the song. Ray Charles recorded a version that earned him the 1994 Grammy Award for Best Male R&B Vocal Performance. Another song from the same album, "Delta Lady", was covered by Bobbie Gentry under the title "Delta Man" on her 1970 album Fancy. The "Leon Russell" album had a number of guest vocalist and accompaniment: Chris Stainton, Bonnie Bramlett, Greg Dempsey, Bob Dylan, Marc Benno, Eric Clapton, Mick Jagger, Keith Richards, George Harrison, Ringo Starr, Joe Cocker, and Merry Clayton. Leon Russell's A Song For You was added to Grammy Hall Of Fame for the 2018 Grammy Hall of Fame class. 

Also in 1970, Russell played piano on Dave Mason's album Alone Together, notably on the song "Sad and Deep as You". The song "The Letter" performed by Joe Cocker with Leon Russell & the Shelter People peaked at #7 on the Hot 100 on May 30, 1970; this was Russell's first hit song.

In November 1970, Russell performed at the Fillmore East, with Elton John on the same bill. Those performances have been bootlegged. Russell and John appeared on The David Frost Show with Fillmore owner Bill Graham on December 3, 1970. Russell's album Prince of Peace: Radio Broadcast 1970 is a soundboard recording of a concert at Fillmore East in late 1970.

Leon Russell and Friends recorded the "Homewood Sessions", broadcast as an "unscripted and unrehearsed" one-hour TV special on KCET (Los Angeles) that aired in December 1970 and was later re-broadcast several times on the Public Broadcasting Service.

Also in December 1970, Rolling Stone magazine carried an interview with Russell. It opened with a characterization of his sound as "those driving, lurchy, churchy rock and roll songs".

Russell produced some tracks for Bob Dylan in March 1971 when Dylan was experimenting with his new sound. The sessions produced the single "Watching the River Flow" and "When I Paint My Masterpiece", both of which prominently featured Russell's gospel-flavored piano.

At the invitation of George Harrison, Russell played piano on Badfinger's third album, Straight Up in the summer of 1971. Leon performed piano, vocals, bass and backing vocals at the two shows of the war-refugees' benefit (Concert for Bangladesh) on August 1, 1971. He was featured performing a medley of the songs "Jumpin' Jack Flash" and "Young Blood" and singing a verse on Harrison's "Beware of Darkness". Bob Dylan surprised Russell by asking him to play bass for some of Dylan's portion of the concert; Russell and Harrison sang harmonies on the chorus of "Just Like a Woman". The Concert for Bangladesh benefit album released in late 1971 was a major critical and commercial success. The release topped album charts in several countries, and went on to win the Grammy Award for Album of the Year in March 1973. The Concert also became an Apple concert benefit film directed by Saul Swimmer and released in spring, 1972.

In 1971, Shelter Records released Leon Russell and the Shelter People and Asylum Choir II (co-produced by Marc Benno) and recorded at Russell's Skyhill Studios. Leon Russell and the Shelter People went on to be Russell's first US gold album. In the same year, Russell played on recording sessions with B. B. King, Eric Clapton, and Bob Dylan.

Russell helped the blues guitarist Freddie King revive his career by collaborating on three of King's albums for Shelter Records during the early 1970s. During those same years, Russell profited from what was then called the "country and western" market by recording and performing under the moniker "Hank Wilson", and was a regular performer at Gilley's Club, a honkytonk in Pasadena, Texas, made famous by the film Urban Cowboy.

Russell recorded the song "Get a Line on You" at Olympic Studios in October 1969, with contributions from Mick Jagger (lead vocal), Ringo Starr (drums), and probably also Bill Wyman (bass) and Mick Taylor (guitar). It was shelved until 1993, when it was issued as a bonus track on the 24K gold re-release by DCC Compact Classics (DCC Compact Classics GZS 1049). The Rolling Stones included the song, under the title "Shine a Light" on their 1972 album Exile on Main St..

In 1972, Russell did a concert tour with his Shelter People entourage. One performance was recorded in California at the Long Beach Arena on August 28, 1972, and was released as a three-record set in 1973 as Leon Live. It became his third U.S. gold album. In November 1972, Billboard cited Russell as a top concert draw and reported the 1972 tour gross at almost $3 million.

Also in 1972, he released his Carney album, which was his third solo studio album. The album peaked at number two on the Billboard 200. The album featured "Tight Rope" and "This Masquerade" (songs released on a 45 as the A side and B side respectively), and became his second gold album.

Russell purchased multiple properties in the early 1970s in his home state of Oklahoma, including the historic The Church Studio in 1972 located on the corner of 3rd Street and Trenton in Tulsa, Oklahoma. The church was also home to Shelter Records. Numerous musicians recorded at The Church, including Willie Nelson, Eric Clapton, Bonnie Raitt, Dwight Twilley, Dr. John, JJ Cale, the Gap Band, Freddie King, Phoebe Snow and Peter Tosh. Tom Petty, with his early band Mudcrutch, signed his first record deal with Shelter Records there.

Looking Back was released by Russell on Olympia Records in 1973, shortly after the success of his single "Tight Rope". It contains instrumental tracks recorded in the mid-1960s, featuring Russell playing the harpsichord.

Russell released the album Hank Wilson's Back Vol. I, which was recorded at producer Owen Bradley's barn studio in Nashville in 1973. The album made it into the Top Thirty Hits. Track one, "Roll in My Sweet Baby's Arms", was a minor hit.

Russell helped the Gap Band, a trio of Tulsa brothers, kick off their chart success in 1974. The group went on to produce several funk-disco hits. The Gap Band backed Russell on his album Stop All That Jazz.

Russell released Live In Japan on Shelter Records. The album was recorded live at Budokan Hall, in Tokyo, on November 8, 1973, and released in 1975.

Russell made it into the 1975 Top 40 with "Lady Blue", from his album Will o' the Wisp. It was his fourth gold album.

Helen Reddy recorded Russell's song "Bluebird" as a single and on her 1975 album No Way to Treat a Lady. The song debuted on the Billboard Hot 100 in the July 5 issue of the magazine and eventually peaked at number 35. That same issue also marked its debut on the magazine's Easy Listening chart, where it spent eight weeks and peaked at number 5; on the RPM singles chart it reached number 51. Reddy said, "I love Leon Russell's writing and I love this song. It was an integral part of my repertoire for nearly 30 years, and I never tired of singing it."

Russell's song "This Masquerade", the B-side of his 1972 hit single "Tight Rope", was later recorded by numerous artists, including Reddy and the Carpenters. George Benson's version of the song reached number 10 on the Billboard Hot 100 and won Record of the Year at the 1977 Grammy Awards. As the song writer, Russell was nominated for Song of the Year in 1977 but lost to Bruce Johnston, who wrote "I Write the Songs". Russell's version of "This Masquerade" was used for the soundtrack for the psychological thriller film Bug, which was directed by William Friedkin. The Bug soundtrack was released on May 22, 2007. The song was also used in the movie The Pursuit of Happyness.

Russell departed Shelter Records in 1976 to start his own record label, Paradise Records.

In 1976, Russell and Barbra Streisand wrote the song "Lost Inside of You" for the film sound track of A Star Is Born. Barbra Streisand and Kris Kristofferson performed the song. The A Star Is Born soundtrack received a Grammy Nominations for Best Album of Original Score written for a Motion Picture or Television Special.

In 1976, Russell released the Wedding Album, a studio album with his then wife, Mary Russell, otherwise known as Mary McCreary. It was the first release by Paradise Records, and it was distributed by Rhino/Warner Bros. Records. Leon and Mary were the album producers, except for the final track "Daylight", which was produced by its writer Bobby Womack.

On May 15, 1976 Leon and Mary performed "Satisfy You" and "Daylight" with John Belushi as Joe Cocker on Saturday Night Live.

Make Love to the Music is the second album by Leon & Mary Russell released in 1977 on Paradise Records.

In 1978, Russell released his Americana album on the Warner Bros. label.

After touring with Willie Nelson, Russell and Nelson in 1979 had a #1 hit on Billboards country music chart with their duet of "Heartbreak Hotel". This single was nominated for Best Country Vocal Performance by a Duo or Group at the 1979 Grammy Awards (presented on February 27, 1980), with the award going to the Charlie Daniels Band for "The Devil Went Down to Georgia". They also released their duet country pop-rock studio album, One for the Road, that year. It was Russell's fifth gold album. The album was nominated for 1979's Album of the Year awarded by the Country Music Association, which went to Kenny Rogers for The Gambler. The track "I Saw the Light" was nominated for Best Inspirational Performance at the 1979 Grammy Awards, which instead went to B. J. Thomas for his album You Gave Me Love (When Nobody Gave Me A Prayer).

Russell built and owned Paradise Studios in Burbank, California; the recording studio had two audio sound stages and one television production stage. The studios complex also had a mobile audio recording bus and remote television production bus that supported the stages or could travel. Paradise Records was also headquartered at the studio. The studio aired a weekly live television music show New Wave Theatre shown on USA network. The studio was used to make music videos from James Taylor and Randy Meisner, also long format video for Willie Nelson, J.J.Cale, Bonnie Raitt and Leon Russell.

Russell released Life And Love, an album on Paradise Records, in 1979. Life and Love has country, rock blues songs that harked back to Leon's work in the early 1970s.

1980s
Russell spent 1980 and 1981  touring with the New Grass Revival, releasing two more albums with Paradise Records before the label folded.

On May 1, 1982 Russell played at Joe Ely's Third Annual Tornado Jam in Lubbock, Texas to a crowd of 25,000. The Jam included Joan Jett and the Crickets.

On May 15, 1980, Russell joined with New Grass Revival to record a live album at Perkins Palace in Pasadena, California, released in 1981 as The Live Album (Leon Russell and New Grass Revival).

In 1982, Russell played piano and percussion on New Grass Revival's Commonwealth album.

Following up on his country theme, he made a second Hank Wilson album, Hank Wilson, Vol. II  released in 1984, Hank Wilson being Russell's self-styled country music alter-ego since the early 1970s. It was released on Leon Russell Records.

Russell released a country blues album, recorded in Hendersonville, Tennessee, at his Paradise Studios, called Solid State. It was released by Paradise Music in 1984.

In 1985, Russell went on tour in the US  He also released the compilation album Best Of Leon Russell: A Song For You.

In 1988 and 1989 Edgar Winter and Russell went on a concert tour of the US and Canada. Edgar Winter is a multi-instrumentalist, songwriter and record producer. In 2002 the DVD Edgar Winter – Live on Stage, Featuring Leon Russell was released.

1990s
Russell released Delta Lady on Del Rack Records in 1991. Many of the songs are remixes of early recordings.

Russell released a new album Anything Can Happen recorded at Paradise Studios, released on Virgin Records in 1991. Pianist Bruce Hornsby produced this comeback album. During the late 1980s and early 1990s Hornsby worked extensively as a producer and sideman with Russell.

In 1993, Paradise Records released the Leon Russell 24k Gold Disc album. It was a remix of recordings done at Olympic Sound in London in 1969.

Russell started Leon Russell Records, an independent record label, in 1995.

Russell released his  Hymns of Christmas Leon Russell: Piano and Orchestra, album with 10 instrumental hymns by Russell on Leon Russell Records in 1995.

Capitol/EMI Records in 1996 released the album Gimme Shelter! The Best of Leon Russell, a two-CD album set with 40-tracks covering 1969–1992.

Capitol/Right Stuff Records released in 1997 the album Retrospective, an album with Russell's 18 all-time best-selling songs.

Russell released a new album Legend in My Time: Hank Wilson Vol. III. Returning to his county artist name on Ark 21 Records, released in 1998 .

Russell released Face in the Crowd in 1999, a blues album on Sagestone Entertainment Records.

Blues: Same Old Song CD was released on Paradise Records in 1999.

2000s

In 2000, Russell and Q Records released Live at Gilley's, a performance from September 17, 1981 at Gilley's Club.  Also in 2000, Leon Russell Records released the rock album Crazy Love on CD.

In 2001, Russell teamed up with multi-instrumentalist Matt Harris to make the latter's album Slightly Elliptical Orbit. They wrote 10 songs for the 12 track album, and Russell sang on the This Train track. The album was released in 2002 on Leon Russell Records.

Signature Songs was released in 2001 on Leon Russell Records. It comprises Russell playing his top songs from his career. It was re-released in 2007 by MRI Associated Labels.

Russell returned as Hank Wilson, but this time with a twist of bluegrass, in Rhythm & Bluegrass: Hank Wilson, Vol. 4, released in 2001 on Leon Russell Records. The songs are with New Grass Revival from the 1980s.

Russell and the others who played on the "Foggy Mountain Breakdown" track each won Grammy Awards for Best Country Instrumental Performance at the 2001 Grammy Awards, which were presented on February 27, 2002.

Moonlight & Love Songs, an album Russell made with the Nashville Symphony, was released on Leon Russell Records in 2002.

In 2002, Russell released a 95-minute DVD titled "A Song for You", that features 25 Russell classic songs from the Shelter People to 2001. There is biographical commentary throughout the DVD. The video is of both concerts and studio sessions. The DVD album Live And Pickling Fast was issued in the same year. This was a  new album of the live Perkins Palace event on May 15, 1980: it had all the original songs from The Live Album (with New Grass Revival), plus all the other songs from the event and bonus tracks.

In 2006, Russell did a 12 city concert tour of the US. On April 23, he received the Living Legend award at Bare Bones International Film Festival and in October he was inducted into the Oklahoma Music Hall of Fame.

Also in 2006, Russell released the Okie rock album Angel in Disguise on his Leon Russell Records label.

Bad Country released on Leon Russell Records in 2007, with 12 original songs by Russell.

Russell played at Diversafest, Tulsa's music conference and festival, in 2007.

Almost Piano was released in 2007 by Leon Russell Records. It is a synthesizer piano collection of ten instrumentals from Russell.

In Your Dreams was released on CD by Leon Russell Records in 2008, as was A Mighty Flood, a gospel album with original songs by him. Billboard magazine described the latter as "a recent treat" and "buoyant".

2010s
On January 31, 2010, Russell joined the Zac Brown Band to play the song Chicken Fried at the Grammy Awards. Zac Brown Band won the Best New Artist award.

After years of reduced prominence, Russell's career was rejuvenated when Elton John sought him for a new project. In November 2009, Russell worked with John and Bernie Taupin on The Union, a double album record credited equally to Russell and John. Recorded in February 2010 and produced by T Bone Burnett, the CD was released on October 19, 2010.

The Union was Russell's sixth gold album. The recordings were interrupted in January 2010 when Russell was hospitalized and underwent surgery for a brain fluid leak, as well as treatment for heart failure and pneumonia.

A couple of months later, Russell announced plans for a solo LP, although no specifics were given, and in October 2010 Russell and John embarked on The Union Tour. John and Russell also appeared on the Late Show with David Letterman.

Russell and John were nominated for their track “If It Wasn't for Bad", from their The Union album, for Best Pop Collaboration with Vocals at the 2010 Grammy Awards, which were presented on February 13, 2011.

In 2011, the documentary film The Union by Cameron Crowe was released. It explored the creative process of John and Russell in the making of the 2010 album The Union. 

On April 2, 2011, Russell and John performed together as the musical guests on Saturday Night Live. Rolling Stone placed the album in third place on its list of the 30 Best Albums of 2010. 

In 2012, Russell and Vince Gill sang the song A Way to Survive on the Living for a Song: A Tribute to Hank Cochran studio album by Jamey Johnson.

Russell played in Willie Nelson's Fourth of July Picnic in Fort Worth, Texas, in 2013. He had first played at the picnic in 1976.

On June 23, 2013, Russell performed on the CMT Crossroads broadcast with Willie Nelson, Sheryl Crow, Jamey Johnson, Norah Jones, Ashley Monroe and Neil Young.

In 2014, the album Life Journey was released on Universal Records. Working with Tommy LiPuma, this album included two new songs by Russell: "Big Lips" and "Down in Dixieland".

On March 16, 2015, a restored version of a previously unreleased 1974 documentary about Russell, A Poem Is A Naked Person by filmmaker Les Blank, was screened at the South by Southwest Film Festival. The film features concert footage of Russell in New Orleans and Anaheim and of the recording sessions for the album Hank Wilson's Back.

In 2015, Russell played at Virginia's Lockn' Festival and the Wildflower! Arts and Music Festival in Richardson, Texas. 

On May 30, 2015, Russell, Bonnie Raitt and Ivan Neville gave a performance at The Canyon Club in Agoura Hills, California, to raise cash for Marty Grebb who was battling cancer. Grebb had played on some of their albums.

On September 11, 2015, he joined Rita Coolidge, Claudia Lennear, Chris Stainton, and other members of the 1970 Mad Dogs & Englishmen Tour for a tribute concert to Joe Cocker organized by the Tedeschi Trucks Band. Original tour photographer Linda Wolf documented the reunion and performance.

Russell had a nationwide concert tour in 2016 and was planning to tour into 2017.

The album On a Distant Shore, recorded in 2016, was posthumously released in September 2017. The album has 12 songs written by Russell. Two of his daughters, Coco Bridges and Sugaree Noel Bridges, perform backing vocals it.

Death

Russell died in his sleep at his Nashville, Tennessee, home on November 13, 2016, at the age of 74. In 2010, he had undergone surgery, and in July 2016, he suffered a heart attack. He was recovering from heart surgery. Russell's funeral was on November 18 at Victory Baptist Church in Mt. Juliet, Tennessee, and a public memorial was held at The Oral Roberts University Mabee Center on November 20 in Tulsa, Oklahoma.  He is interred at the Memorial Park Cemetery in Tulsa, Oklahoma.

Musical style and influence

Russell's music style encompassed rock, country, gospel, bluegrass, rhythm and blues, southern rock, blues rock, rock and roll, folk, surf, swamp rock and Tulsa Sound.

Elton John, who had once been Russell's opening act, acknowledged him as his "biggest influence as a piano player, a singer and a songwriter." On hearing of Russell's death, he said: "My darling Leon Russell passed away last night. He was a mentor, inspiration and so kind to me. I loved him and always will." John once recalled:

Pixies vocalist Black Francis credits Russell with influencing his vocal style: "I realise there's a certain kind of vocalising I do that takes its cue from Leon Russell. He sang in a Southern accent but it was very blown-out and exaggerated, very free and loose."

One of Russell's titles and signature nicknames is: Master of Space and Time.

The depth and scope Leon’s contribution to the music of the twentieth century is illustrated by the following:

408 Albums on which he received a Credit

251 Total Artistic Credits
37 Types of Artistic Credits
 Piano - 77 Credits
 Arranger - 23 
 Keyboards - 20 
 Guitar - 17 
 Organ - 14 
 Electric Piano - 11 
 Guest - 11 
 Vocals – 11 
 Bass - 10 
 Miscellaneous – 58 (Miscellaneous includes Percussion, Trumpet, Moog, Clavinet and 23 more types)

282 Total Writing Credits
5 Types of Writing Credits
 Songwriter – 161 Credits
 Writer – 87
 Composer – 20
 Music – 8
 Lyrics – 6

45 Production Credits

Personal life
Russell had six children: a daughter from a relationship with Carla McHenry; a son and daughter from his first marriage, to Mary McCreary; and three daughters from his later marriage to Janet Lee Constantine.

Discography

Studio and live albums

Compilation albums

Singles

Music videos

See also
Ambrose Campbell toured and recorded with Leon Russell.
Don Nix producer at Shelter Records
Jesse Ed Davis  friend who introduced Russell to recording session work
Kathi McDonald Russell's main background vocalist 
Patrick Henderson Songwriter with Russell
Indianola Mississippi Seeds Made Russell's Hummingbird a hit single 
Muscle Shoals Rhythm Section  Made some of Russell's songs hit singles

References

External links

Leon Russell on Find A Grave
Leon Russell NAMM Oral History Program Interview (2012)

1942 births
2016 deaths
American male singer-songwriters
American rock musicians
American session musicians
American rock songwriters
American rock singers
Swamp rock musicians
Burials in Oklahoma
Musicians from Tulsa, Oklahoma
People from Lawton, Oklahoma
Delaney & Bonnie & Friends members
The Wrecking Crew (music) members
Grammy Award winners
American rock pianists
American male pianists
American rock guitarists
American male guitarists
Charay Records artists
American rock keyboardists
American mandolinists
American organists
American male organists
American multi-instrumentalists
Guitarists from Oklahoma
Record producers from Oklahoma
20th-century American guitarists
21st-century American keyboardists
20th-century American keyboardists
20th-century American male singers
20th-century American singers
21st-century American male singers
21st-century American singers
Singer-songwriters from Oklahoma
A&M Records artists